The Mob Squad is a nickname that was officially used by the Rams of the National Football League during both their last season in St. Louis and their first seasons back in Los Angeles. The team only used the moniker in official branding and merchandising from 2015 to 2018, but many fans and third party media outlets still use the term to refer to the team to this day, as some of the core players have remained on the roster. The Mob Squad era has been defined by defensive tackle Aaron Donald, the team's 2014 first-round selection who has won multiple Defensive Player of the Year awards and is widely considered the best defensive player in the league; quarterback Jared Goff, selected first overall in the 2016 draft with multiple Pro-Bowl selections who served as the offensive leader until being traded in 2021; and Todd Gurley, the team's 2015 first-round selection and star Pro-Bowler running back until his 2019 departure. The Rams have also been home to many other notable players during this period, such as Cooper Kupp, Brandin Cooks, and Robert Woods, among others. The Mob Squad has defined the period of transition from St. Louis as well as the quick rise to prominence the team experienced in Los Angeles under head coach Sean McVay.

Accolades

Team Achievements
 2x NFC West champions (2017, 2018)
 NFC Champions (2018)

Player Achievements

Aaron Donald
 Super Bowl Champion (LVI)
 Associated Press NFL Defensive Player of the Year (2017, 2018)
 9× First-team All-Pro selection (2015–2021)
 8x Pro Bowl selection (2014–2021)
 NFL sacks leader/Deacon Jones Award (2018)
 NFL 2010s All-Decade Team
 5× PFWA All-NFL Team (2015–2019)
 4× PFF NFL Defensive Player of the Year (2015, 2016, 2018, 2019)
 Pro Football Writers Association NFL Defensive Player of the Year (2018)
 Kansas City Committee of 101 NFC Defensive Player of the Year (2017, 2018)
 6× NFL Top 100 (2015–2020)
 Ranked No. 92 in 2015
 Ranked No. 14 in 2016
 Ranked No. 15 in 2017
 Ranked No. 7 in 2018
 Ranked No. 1 in 2019
 Ranked No. 3 in 2020
 2× NFC Defensive Player of the Month (Oct. 2018, Dec. 2018)
 7× NFC Defensive Player of the Week (2015 – Week 1, Week 14; 2016 – Week 4; 2018 – Week 7, Week 16;  2019 – Week 11; 2020 – Week 5)

Jared Goff
 2× Pro Bowl (2017, 2018)
 PFWA Most Improved Player (2017)

Cooper Kupp
 Super Bowl champion (LVI)
 Super Bowl MVP (LVI)
 NFL Offensive Player of the Year
 First-team All-Pro (2021)
 Pro Bowl (2021)
 NFL receptions leader (2021)
 NFL receiving yards leader (2021)
 NFL receiving touchdowns leader (2021)
 PFWA All-Rookie Team (2017)

Todd Gurley
 NFL Offensive Player of the Year (2017)
 NFL Offensive Rookie of the Year (2015)
 2× First-team All-Pro selection (2017, 2018)
 3× Pro Bowl selection (2015, 2017, 2018)
 3x NFC Offensive Player of the Month (2017 – September, December; 2018 – October)
 5x NFC Offensive Player of the Week (2017 – Week 4, Week 15, Week 16; 2018 – Week 6, Week 13)
 FedEx Ground Player of the Year (2017)
 2x NFL Top 100
 Ranked No. 22 in 2016
 Ranked No. 6 2018
 PFWA All-Rookie Team (2015)

Pro Bowlers

References

Los Angeles Rams
Sports in Los Angeles
American football in Los Angeles